Old Crow  is a community in the Canadian territory of Yukon.

Located in a periglacial environment, the community is situated on the Porcupine River in the far northern part of the territory. Old Crow is the only Yukon community that cannot be reached by motor vehicle, requiring visitors to fly in to Old Crow Airport. It is a dry community. Old Crow is also the northernmost non-Inuit community in North America, and the only such community situated north of the Arctic Circle.

History 

An Indigenous chief named Deetru` K`avihdik, literally "Crow-May-I-Walk", helped settle a community here around the 1870s and the town was named after him. The village was founded around muskrat trapping, which continues to provide basic income.

The people of Old Crow are dependent on the Porcupine caribou herd for food and clothing. The Porcupine caribou herd migrates to the coastal plain in the Arctic National Wildlife Refuge (ANWR) in Alaska to give birth to their young. Many citizens of Old Crow believe the herd is being seriously threatened by oil-drilling in the ANWR and have been heavily involved in lobbying to prevent it.

Demographics 

Most of its population are Gwich'in, a First Nations people who belong to the Vuntut Gwitchin First Nation.

Infrastructure

Transportation 
Old Crow Airport provides year-round transportation to other communities. During winter time, a temporary winter road is sometimes built to transport freight into Old Crow; it is not annual, but only when a significant need arises such as a major building project.

Energy supply 
Electric energy is supplied by three diesel generators (170 kW, 330 kW and 600 kW), operated by ATCO Electric Yukon. As the community has no road access, diesel fuel needs to be flown in.

In 2019, the microgrid was extended by a PV plant which generates electricity in the summer season, thus saving about 190.000 litres of diesel per year (~400,000 $/a). The plant has been built in an back-to-back configuration to receive a mostly continuous solar harvest during the day. Consequently, the DC capacity of the PV panels (in sum 940 kWpeak) is partly orientated westwards and partly eastwards; the AC capacity of the PV inverter is 480 kW. A battery energy storage system (BESS) has been added with an energy capacity of 350 kWh, balancing out smaller cloud fluctuations and avoiding rapid start stop cycles of the diesel gensets. The whole PV-BESS plant is $6.5 million and shall last for at least 25 years.

By May 2021, the solar plant had begun producing electricity, projected to be fully operational by July and capable of letting the community turn off their diesel generators on sunny days.

Communications 
Old Crow is served by Northwestel since 1971.  The long distance connection originally relied on a microwave relay at Rat Pass near the Yukon/NWT border, which also provide a radio-telephone base station along the Dempster Highway, but it was frequently out of service in winter when weather conditions made helicopter access hazardous. In the late 1980s, a satellite ground station was installed in Old Crow, providing more reliable service.

The long distance connection is noteworthy for two minor incidents.  In 1985, the Yukon territorial election was covered by live television coverage for the first time, sent by satellite to Toronto for switching into the network stations in Yukon; however, results from Old Crow were unavailable due to the microwave failure.  On 11 September 2001, the satellite connection went out of service, and an aircraft bringing a technician to repair it was challenged by Canadian Forces aircraft for violating the closure of airspace throughout North America.

The community operated its own television transmitter to carry CBC television signals from satellite.  The current status of this transmitter is unknown since the CBC in 2012 closed down analog transmitters it owned.  The community has APTN television, as well as CHON-FM and CKRW transmitters and a community-owned transmitter picking up CBC station CHAK-AM in Inuvik.

Geography

Climate 
Old Crow has a subarctic climate (Köppen climate classification Dfc) with mild summers and severely cold winters. Precipitation is very low, but is somewhat higher in the summer.

As Old Crow is located north of the Arctic Circle, it experiences polar day or midnight sun in summer and polar night in winter.
The midnight sun is typically between May 5 and August 8 inclusive, while the polar night usually starts around December 14 and ends by December 29.

Notable residents
Edith Josie, journalist

References

Further reading

 Josie, Edith. Old Crow News: The Best of Edith Josie, 1964. Whitehorse, Yukon: Whitehorse Star, 1964.
 McSkimming, Robert James. Territory, Territoriality and Cultural Change in an Indigenous Society: Old Crow, Yukon Territory. [S.l: s.n.], 1975.

External links

Old Crow's official website

Settlements in Yukon
Gwich'in
Populated places in Arctic Canada
Road-inaccessible communities of Canada